The McGill Tribune is an independent campus newspaper published by the Tribune Publication Society in Montreal, Quebec, Canada. The Tribune has been entirely student-run since its foundation in 1981, and has a good reputation for unbiased and trustworthy reporting. The Tribune covers a variety of different subjects, including but not limited to news, opinion, student life & features, arts & entertainment, science & technology, and sports. It has a print circulation of 2,000 between McGill's downtown and Macdonald campuses. It publishes once a week on Tuesdays in print, with additional daily content online.

In March 2010, following a student referendum, the Tribune severed its ties with the Students' Society of McGill University (SSMU), which had previously published the newspaper. The newspaper is now published by the Tribune Publication Society - a non-profit, independent students' society.

In April 2017, it published "It doesn't matter because it didn't happen on campus", an investigative news story by Shrinkhala Dawadi (former news editor and managing editor) and Julia Dick (then editor-in-chief). This story was picked up by the CBC, the Globe & Mail, and the Montreal Gazette.

Notable alumni

 Gail Simmons, Top Chef judge, host Top Chef: Just Desserts and contributor to Food and Wine Magazine
 Christian Lander, founder of the Stuff White People Like blog
 Adam Sternbergh, The New York Times Magazine culture editor
 Byron Tau, Wall Street Journal reporter
 Tim Mak, NPR reporter
 John Semley, editor of The A.V. Club Toronto, The Walrus and Torontoist contributor
 Elizabeth Perle, The Huffington Post teen editor
 Carolyn Gregoire, The Huffington Post teen associate editor
 Stephanie Levitz, Parliament Hill reporter, The Canadian Press
 Sara Jean Green, The Seattle Times reporter

See also
List of student newspapers in Canada
List of newspapers in Canada

References

External links
 

McGill University
Newspapers published in Montreal
Student newspapers published in Quebec
English-language newspapers published in Quebec
Publications established in 1981
1981 establishments in Quebec